The Minister for Western Sydney is a minister in the New South Wales Government with responsibility for the Greater Western Sydney, Australia.

It was first established in 1997 in the second Carr ministry as an assistant minister, before becoming a separate portfolio in the third Carr ministry. The portfolio was only intermittently responsible for any legislation, nor tasked with the management of a department. The region is not defined, although generally consistent with Greater Western Sydney the portfolio has on occasion been responsible for areas outside that region, such as the Sydney Olympic Park.

In the second Perrottet ministry  the portfolio is responsible for the Western Parkland City Authority, which includes the region around the Western Sydney Airport. The current minister is David Elliott since August 2022.

List of ministers
The following individuals have served as Minister for Western Sydney, or any precedent titles:

 Assistant ministers ==== Assistant ministers ====

References

Western Sydney